Christie is a surname of Scottish origin.

The name originated as a patronymic, meaning "son of Christian" or "son of Christopher". When used as a personal name in present-day English, it is a pet form of the personal name Christian (or, for females, of Christine/Christina).

At the time of the British Census of 1881, the relative frequency of the surname Christie was highest in Kincardineshire (43.7 times the British average), followed by Shetland, Forfarshire, Fife, Aberdeenshire, Perthshire, Banffshire, Elginshire, Clackmannanshire and Haddingtonshire. In Scotland the Christies are considered to be a  sept of Clan Farquharson .

Spelling variations of the Christie name include: Christie, Chrystie, Chrysty, Christy, McChristie, Christe, Christi, Christee and many more.

By surname 
 A V. Christie (fl. 1990-2000s), American poet
 Agatha Christie (1890–1976), English author
 Al Christie (1881–1951), Canadian film maker
 Alec Christie (fl. 1990-2000s), English actor
 Alexander Christie (governor) (1792–1872), Scottish-born Canadian explorer
 Alexander Christie (bishop) (1848–1925), American Roman Catholic Bishop
 Alexander Christie (portrait painter) (1901–1946), British artist
 Amalie Christie (1913–2010), Norwegian pianist
 Angélla Christie (fl. 1980–2000s), American musician
 Arthur Christie (1921–2003), English government/military person
 Bessie Christie (1904 – 1983), New Zealand painter
 Bob Christie (disambiguation), multiple people
 Brian Christie (fl. 1990s), American television personality
 Brian Christie (neuroscientist) (born 1964), Canadian medical researcher and educator
 Campbell Christie (1937–2011), Scottish labour leader
 Campbell Christie (writer) (1893–1963), British playwright
 Charles Christie (officer) (died 1812), British officer
 Charles Christie (1880–1955), Canadian film maker
 Charlie Christie (born 1966), Scottish footballer
 Chris Christie (born 1962), American politician
 Christian Christie (1832–1906), Norwegian architect
 David Christie (disambiguation), multiple people
 Derrick Christie (born 1957), English footballer
 Dick Christie (born 1948), American actor
 Dinah Christie (born 1942), English-born Canadian actress
 Doug Christie (disambiguation), multiple people
 Dugald Christie (1941–2006), Canadian political activist
 Ed Christie (fl. 1990s), American puppeteer
 Edvard Eilert Christie (1773–1831), Norwegian businessperson and politician
 Elise Christie (born 1990), British short track speed skater 
 Erling Christie (1928–1996), Norwegian author
 Errol Christie (1963–2017), English boxer
 Evie Christie (born 1979), Canadian poet
 Florence Christie (1903–1983), US citizen, subject of a famous Depression-era photograph
 Frank Christie (1927–1996), Scottish football player and manager
 Fyffe Christie (1918–1979), Anglo-Scottish artist
 Gabriel Christie (general) (1722–1799), Scottish soldier
 Gabriel Christie (Maryland politician) (1756–1808), American politician
 Gary Christie (fl. 1990s), Scottish rugby league player
 George Christie (disambiguation), multiple people
 Gerry Christie (born 1957), Scottish footballer
 Gilbert Christie (1892–?), Scottish footballer
 Gordon Christie (1914–2001), New Zealand politician
 Grace Christie (1872–1953), English embroiderer and embroidery historian
 Gwendoline Christie (born 1978), English actress
 Hans Langsted Christie (1826–1907), Norwegian jurist and politician
 Hartvig Caspar Christie (physicist) (1826–1873), Norwegian physicist
 Hartvig Caspar Christie (1893–1959), Norwegian politician
 Hugh Christie (?-1962), English farmer and educator
 Ian Christie (disambiguation), multiple people
 Iyseden Christie (born 1976), English football player
 Jack Christie, Canadian racing car driver
 James Christie (disambiguation), multiple people
 Jeff Christie (born 1983), Canadian luger
 Jeremy Christie (born 1983), New Zealand footballer
 Joanna Christie (born 1982), English actress
 Johan Koren Christie (writer) (1814–1885), Norwegian writer
 Johan Koren Christie (officer) (1909–1995), Norwegian engineer and air force officer
 John Christie (disambiguation), multiple people
 J. Walter Christie (1865–1944), US engineer and inventor
 Jonatan Christie (born 1997), Indonesian badminton player
 Joseph Christie (fl. 1990-2000s), English hip hop musician
 Julie Christie (born 1941), English actress
 Ken Christie (born 1927), Australian footballer
 Keith Christie (1931–1980), English musician
 Kevin Christie (disambiguation), multiple people
 Kitch Christie (1940–1998), South African rugby coach
 Linford Christie (born 1960), Jamaica-born English sprinter
 Loring Christie (1885–1941), Canadian politician
 Lou Christie (born 1943), American singer-songwriter
 Louise Christie (born 2000), British rhythmic gymnast 
 Lyn Christie (born 1928?), Australian-born American doctor and musician
 Malcolm Christie (born 1979), English footballer
 Max Christie (politician) (1889–1982), New Zealand politician
 Michael Christie (disambiguation), multiple people
 Mike Christie (singer) (born 1981), English musician
 Mike Christie (ice hockey) (born 1949), American hockey player
 Morven Christie (born 1979), Scottish actress
 Moss Christie (1902–1978), Australian swimmer
 Ned Christie (1852–1892), Cherokee statesman
 Neil Christie (fl. 1990-2000s), British academic
 Norman Christie (born 1911), English footballer
 Paddy Christie (born 1976), Irish footballer
 Paul Christie (disambiguation), multiple people
 Perry Christie (born 1944), Prime Minister of the Bahamas
 Peter Christie (1846–1933), Canadian politician
 Peter G. Christie (born 1941), Canadian politician
 Qona Christie (born 1999), New Zealand judoka
 Rachel Christie (born 1989), English model and athlete
 Rajendran Christie (fl. 1960s), Indian field hockey player
 Ralph Waldo Christie (1893–1987), admiral in the United States Navy
 Rawdon Christie (fl. 1990-2000s), English-born TV presenter in Australia and New Zealand
 Reg Christie, alternative name of John Christie (murderer) (1899–1953))
 Richard Copley Christie (1830–1901), English lawyer and educator
 Robert Christie (disambiguation), multiple people
 Roger Christie (born 1949), American minister and cannabis activist
 Ryan Christie (born 1995), Scottish footballer
 Ryan Christie (ice hockey) (born 1978), Canadian ice hockey player
 Samuel Hunter Christie (1784–1865), English scientist and mathematician
 Sara Stockfleth Christie (1857–1948), Norwegian educator and politician
 Scott Christie (footballer) (born 1987), Scottish footballer
 Sidney Lee Christie (1903–1974), American jurist
 Steve Christie (born 1967), Canadian player of American football
 Stuart Christie (1946–2020), Scottish anarchist notable for attempting to assassinate Francisco Franco
 Thomas Christie (disambiguation), multiple people, including:
 Thomas Christie (1761–1796), Scottish political writer
 Thomas Christie (Canadian politician) (1834–1902), Canadian politician
 Thomas Christie Jr. (1855–1934), Canadian politician
 Thomas P. Christie (fl. 1950s), American government figure
 Tinoi Christie (born 1976), New Zealand footballer
 Tom Christie (rower) (born 1927), English rower and doctor
 Tony Christie (born 1943), English musician
 Trevor Christie (born 1959), English footballer
 Walter John Christie (1905–1983), English civil servant
 Warren Christie (born 1975), Irish actor
 Werner Christie (disambiguation), multiple people, including:
 Werner Hosewinckel Christie (1877–1927) (1877–1927), Norwegian agricultural researcher
 Werner Hosewinckel Christie (officer) (1917–2004), Norwegian air force officer
 Werner Christie (born 1949), Norwegian politician
 Wilhelm Frimann Koren Christie (1778–1849), Norwegian statesman
 William Christie (disambiguation), multiple people, including:
William Mellis Christie (1829–1900), Scottish-born Canadian cookie company founder
 William Christie (musician) (born 1944), American musician
 William Christie (astronomer) (1845–1922), English astronomer
 William Christie (Ulster politician) (1913–2008), Irish politician
 William Christie (Missionary) (1870-1955)
 William J. Christie (fl. 1870-1890s), Canadian politician
 William Christie (Conservative politician) (1830–1913), British Member of Parliament for Lewes 1874–1885
 Winifred Christie (1882–1965), Scottish musician

By given name

Fictional 
 Christie Monteiro, a character from the Tekken series of games
 Christie (Dead or Alive), a character from the Dead or Alive series of games
 Thomas "Tom" Christie, a character in Diana Gabaldon's Outlander book series and the TV adaptation.

See also 
 Christie (disambiguation)
 Christy (surname)
 Christy (disambiguation)

References 

English-language surnames
Scottish surnames
Surnames from given names